{{DISPLAYTITLE:C11H16N2O8}}
The molecular formula C11H16N2O8 may refer to:

 N-Acetylaspartylglutamic acid
 Base J, or β-D-Glucopyranosyloxymethyluracil

Molecular formulas